Royville is an unincorporated town in Perry Township, Allen County, in the U.S. state of Indiana.

Political districts
 List of United States senators from Indiana
 Indiana's 3rd congressional district
 State Senate District 15 Liz Brown
 State House District 84 Robert Morris
 Board of Commissioners
 Richard E. Beck Jr.
 Therese M. Brown
 F. Nelson Peters
 Prosecuting Attorney, Karen E. Richards
 Sheriff, David Gladieux
 County Treasurer, William Royce

(information as of May 2020)

Cemeteries
 Union Chapel Cemetery

School districts
 Northwest Allen County Schools (NACS)

References

Unincorporated communities in Allen County, Indiana
Unincorporated communities in Indiana
Fort Wayne, IN Metropolitan Statistical Area